The Good Man may refer to:
 The Good Man (film), a 2012 film
 The Good Man (Fear the Walking Dead), an episode of the television series Fear the Walking Dead

See also
 Good Man (disambiguation)
 Goodman (disambiguation)